KolaDaisi University is a private university in Ibadan, Oyo State. The University was founded by Chief KolaDaisi, CON, Bashorun of Ibadan as its Proprietor. It is associated with the KolaDaisi Foundation (KDF). KolaDaisi University (KDU), after approval by the Federal Executive Council, was licensed by the National Universities Commission to operate as a Private University in November, 2016.

References

Universities and colleges in Ibadan
Educational institutions established in 2016
2016 establishments in Nigeria
Private universities and colleges in Africa